The 1976 Tripoli Agreement was signed on December 23, 1976 in Tripoli, Libya by Carmelo Z. Barbero, representing the Government of the Philippines and Nur Misuari of the Moro National Liberation Front. The agreement defined autonomous administrative divisions for Muslims in the southern Philippines, the establishment of an autonomous government, judicial system for Sharia law and special security forces, and the observance of a ceasefire. The autonomous region was to have its own economic system, including an Islamic bank.

Facilitators of the agreement included members of the Quadripartite Ministerial Commission of the Organization of Islamic Conference, headed by Ali Abdussalam Treki, representing Muammar Gaddafi, leader of the host country, and the OIC Secretary General, Amadou Karim Gaye. The other members of the Quadripartite Ministerial Commission aside from Treki included representatives from Saudi Arabia, Senegal and Somalia.

Events prior to agreement
The declaration of martial law by President Ferdinand Marcos in September 1972 contributed to the ongoing Moro conflict, with Abul Khayr Alonto and Jallaludin Santos establishing the Moro National Liberation Front with Nur Misuari as chairman a month later that same year. With the MNLF receiving support from Malaysia and Libya, Marcos offered Muammar Gaddafi, a lucrative oil deal in exchange for his withdrawal of support for the MNLF through Malaysia; this brought Misuari to the negotiation table in 1976.

Marcos sent his wife, Imelda Marcos, to meet with Gaddafi in Libya in November 1976. Accompanying the First Lady was a 60-person entourage that included Industry Secretary Vicente Paterno. Imelda Marcos' duty was "to charm Col. Kadaffi into finally terminating aid and support for Nur Misuari of the Moro National Liberation Front". Her efforts bore fruit; representatives of the Philippine government and the MNLF met at the negotiating table in December 1976.

Autonomous areas agreed upon
The following thirteen provinces in the southern Philippines were agreed upon by the parties involved to be included for autonomy: Basilan, Sultan Kudarat, Sulu, Lanao del Norte, Tawi-tawi, Lanao del Sur, Zamboanga del Sur, Davao del Sur, Zamboanga del Norte, South Cotabato, North Cotabato, Palawan and Maguindanao.

During the negotiations, Marcos noted in his diary that Misuari and the Libyan diplomat Ali Treki kept insisting that "all of Mindanao, Sulu and Palawan be organized into one region. But they are willing to submit this to a referendum." Marcos was inclined to agree since he was of the opinion that "Palawan, the three Davaos, the two Surigaos, the two Agusans, Southern Cotabato, Bukidnon, the two Misamis, possibly Lanao del Norte, Zamboanga del Norte and others" would not want to be included in the Muslim autonomous region. A day before the agreement was signed, negotiations stalled and Gaddafi asked for Imelda Marcos to return to Libya to hasten the talks. Imelda was able to convince the Libyan leader via telephone to accept the Philippine President's proposal, which was to "submit the question of autonomy to the constitutional process of the Philippines" for the thirteen provinces. The agreement was signed the following day.
    
Ferdinand Marcos would later implement the agreement by creating two autonomous regions (instead of one) consisting of ten (instead of thirteen) provinces. This led to the collapse of the peace pact and the resumption of hostilities between the MNLF and Philippine government forces.

Succeeding treaties
A year after Marcos was ousted from power during the People Power Revolution, the government under Corazon Aquino signed the 1987 Jeddah Accord in Saudi Arabia with the MNLF, agreeing to hold further discussions on the proposal for autonomy to the entirety of Mindanao and not just the thirteen provinces stated in the 1976 Tripoli Agreement. In 1989, however, an act establishing the Autonomous Region in Muslim Mindanao was passed. The MNLF demanded that the thirteen Tripoli Agreement provinces be included in the ARMM, but the government refused; eight of those provinces were predominantly Christian. Shortly thereafter, the government held a plebiscite in the thirteen provinces. Four provinces; Lanao del Sur, Maguindanao, Sulu and Tawi-tawi voted to be included in the ARMM. The MNLF boycotted the plebiscite and refused to recognize the ARMM.

Under the administration of Fidel V. Ramos, the government and the MNLF signed the 1996 Final Peace Agreement in Jakarta, Indonesia. It enabled qualified MNLF members to enter the ranks of the Armed Forces of the Philippines and the Philippine National Police, and created the Southern Philippines Council for Peace and Development, which was dominated by the MNLF. Misuari then ran unopposed as governor of the ARMM. The peace agreement earned Ramos and Misuari the 1997 Félix Houphouët-Boigny Peace Prize.

That same year, the Moro Islamic Liberation Front, which had broken away from the MNLF in 1977, began informal talks with the Ramos-led government. These, however, were not pursued and the MILF began recruiting and establishing camps, becoming the dominant Muslim rebel group. The administration of Joseph Estrada advocated a hardline stance against the MILF; that of Gloria Macapagal Arroyo tried to sign a peace agreement with it, but it was declared unconstitutional by the Supreme Court of the Philippines.

Shortly after Benigno Aquino III assumed the Presidency in 2010, he met with MILF chairman Murad Ebrahim in Tokyo, Japan. In 2012, the Philippine government and the MILF signed the Framework Agreement on the Bangsamoro, which calls for the creation of the Bangsamoro, an autonomous political entity which will replace the Autonomous Region in Muslim Mindanao, which Aquino describes as a "failed experiment".

See also
1987 Jeddah Accord
1996 Final Peace Agreement
Framework Agreement on the Bangsamoro

External links
Text of the 1976 Tripoli Agreement on the Philippines' Office of the Presidential Adviser on the Peace Process website

References

1976 in the Philippines
1976 in Libya
Bangsamoro peace process
Boundary treaties
Treaties concluded in 1976
Treaties of the Philippines
Presidency of Ferdinand Marcos